George England (fl. 1735), was an English divine and author. 
England was a member of the England family which flourished at Yarmouth, Norfolk, in the 16th and 17th centuries, and may have been a grandson of Sir George England.

Career
He was chaplain to Lord Hobart, by whom he was presented in 1733 to the living of Hanworth, Norfolk. In 1737 he resigned Hanworth to become rector of Wolterton and Wickmere, a consolidated living in the same county.

Writings
He was the author of ‘An Enquiry into the Morals of the Ancients,’ London, 1737, 4to, a work based on the belief that the ‘ancients,’ by whom is understood the Greeks and Romans, were much superior in the practice of morality to Christians in general.

References

Year of birth missing
Year of death missing
18th-century English non-fiction writers
18th-century English male writers
18th-century English Christian theologians
Clergy from Norfolk
English Christian religious leaders